"Take Me Home, Country Roads", also known simply as "Country Roads", is a song written by Bill Danoff, Taffy Nivert and John Denver. It was released as a single performed by Denver on April 12, 1971, peaking at number two on Billboards US Hot 100 singles for the week ending August 28, 1971. The song was a success on its initial release and was certified Gold by the RIAA on August 18, 1971, and Platinum on April 10, 2017. The song became one of John Denver's most popular songs. It has continued to sell, with over 1.6 million digital copies sold in the United States.

The song is considered a symbol of West Virginia. In March 2014, it became one of the four official state anthems of West Virginia.

Composition
Inspiration for the title line had come while Taffy Nivert and Bill Danoff, who were married, were driving along Clopper Road in Montgomery County, Maryland to a gathering of Nivert's family in Gaithersburg, with Nivert behind the wheel while Danoff played his guitar. "I just started thinking, country roads, I started thinking of me growing up in western New England and going on all these small roads," Danoff said. "It didn’t have anything to do with Maryland or anyplace." 

To Danoff, the lyric "(t)he radio reminds me of my home far away" in the bridge is quintessentially West Virginian, an allusion to when he listened to the program Saturday Night Jamboree, broadcast from Wheeling, West Virginia, on WWVA at his home in Springfield, Massachusetts during his childhood in the 1950s.

Danoff was influenced by friend and West Virginian actor Chris Sarandon, and members of a West Virginia commune who attended Danoff's performances. Of the commune members, Danoff remarked, "They brought their dogs and were a very colorful group of folks, but that is how West Virginia began creeping into the song." While the song was inspired by Danoff's upbringing in Springfield, Massachusetts, he "didn't want to write about Massachusetts because [he] didn't think the word was musical."

Starting December 22, 1970, Denver was heading the New Year's bill at The Cellar Door, with Fat City opening for him, just as Denver had opened at the same club for then headliner David Steinberg. After the club's post-Christmas reopening night on Tuesday, December 29 (Cellar Door engagements ran from Tuesday to Sunday and this booking was for two weeks), the three headed back to the couple's apartment for an impromptu jam. On the way, Denver's left thumb was broken in a collision. He was rushed to the emergency room, where the thumb was put in a splint. By the time they got back to the apartment, Denver said he was "wired, you know."

When Danoff and Nivert ran through what they had of the song they had been working on for about a month, planning to sell to Johnny Cash, Denver "flipped." He decided he had to have it, prompting them to abandon plans for the sale. The verses and chorus were still missing a bridge, so the three of them went about finishing.

Nivert got out an encyclopedia to learn more about West Virginia, and the first thing she came upon was the Rhododendron, the state flower, so she kept trying to work the word Rhododendron into the song. Rhododendron was the title that Nivert had written down on the lyric sheet, which they later sent to ASCAP. The three stayed up until 6:00 a.m., changing words and moving lines around.

When they finished, on the morning of Wednesday, December 30, 1970, Denver announced that the song had to go on his next album. Later that night, during Denver's first set, Denver called his two collaborators back to the spotlight, where the trio changed their career trajectories, reading the lyrics from a single, handheld, unfolded piece of paper. According to Len Jaffe, a Washington, D.C.-based singer-songwriter who attended the show where Denver premiered the song, this resulted in a five-minute standing ovation. The next day was Denver's 28th birthday. They recorded it in New York City in January 1971.

"Take Me Home, County Roads" is written in a Key of A major, and composed in a tempo of 82 beats per minute per common time.

Commercial performance
"Take Me Home, Country Roads" appeared on the LP Poems, Prayers & Promises and was released as a 45 in the spring of 1971. Original pressings credited the single to "John Denver with Fat City". It broke nationally in mid-April but moved up the charts very slowly. After several weeks, RCA Records called John and told him that they were giving up on the single. His response: "No! Keep working on it!" They did, and the single went to number 1 on the Record World Pop Singles Chart and the Cash Box Top 100, and number 2 on the U.S. Billboard Hot 100, topped only by "How Can You Mend a Broken Heart" by The Bee Gees.

On August 18, 1971, it was certified Gold by the RIAA for a million copies shipped. The song continued to sell in the digital era. As of January 2020, the song has also sold 1,591,000 downloads since it became available digitally.

Reception in West Virginia

"Take Me Home, Country Roads" received an enthusiastic response from West Virginians. On November 1, 2017, the West Virginia Tourism Office announced it had obtained the rights to use "Take Me Home, Country Roads", in its marketing efforts. "'Country Roads' has become synonymous with West Virginia all over the world," said West Virginia Tourism Commissioner Chelsea Ruby. "It highlights everything we love about our state: scenic beauty, majestic mountains, a timeless way of life, and most of all, the warmth of a place that feels like home whether you've lived here forever or are just coming to visit." The opening phrase of the song, "Almost heaven", became a primary tourism office slogan.

The song is the theme song of West Virginia University and it has been performed during every home football pregame show since 1972. The song is played for other athletic events and university functions, including after football games, for which the fans are encouraged to stay in the stands and sing the song along with the team. On September 6, 1980, at the invitation of West Virginia Governor Jay Rockefeller, songwriters Danoff, Nivert, and Denver performed the song during pregame festivities to a sold-out crowd of Mountaineer fans. This performance marked the dedication of the current West Virginia University Mountaineer Field and the first game for head coach Don Nehlen. 

The popularity of the song inspired resolutions in the West Virginia Legislature to adopt "Take Me Home, Country Roads" as an official state song. On March 7, 2014, the West Virginia Legislature approved a resolution to make "Take Me Home, Country Roads" an official state song of West Virginia, alongside three other pieces: "West Virginia Hills", "This Is My West Virginia", and "West Virginia, My Home Sweet Home". Governor Earl Ray Tomblin signed the resolution into law on March 8, 2014. 

The song was played at the funeral for West Virginia Senator Robert Byrd at the state capitol in Charleston, West Virginia on July 2, 2010.

The Mountain State Brewing Company based in Thomas, West Virginia, produces an amber ale named "Almost Heaven," which it says is "named after John Denver's ode to West Virginia, 'Country Roads'".

Personnel
John Denver – vocals, 6- & 12-string acoustic guitar
Bill Danoff – backing vocals 
Taffy Nivert – backing vocals
Eric Weissberg – banjo, steel guitar
Mike Taylor – acoustic guitar
Richard Kniss – double bass
Gary Chester – drums, percussion

Charts

Certifications

Cover versions

Hermes House Band version

Dutch pop band Hermes House Band covered the song and released it as "Country Roads". This version was first released in Germany on May 21, 2001, and was issued in the United Kingdom on December 3, 2001, where it was a contender for the 2001 Christmas number-one single. This version was a chart success in Europe, reaching number one in Scotland, number two in Germany and Ireland, and the top 10 in Austria, Denmark, and the United Kingdom.

Track listings

Charts

Certifications

Olivia Newton-John version
Olivia Newton-John released a cover version in January 1973 that reached number 6 in Japan and number 15 in the UK. It was the lead single from her third studio album, Let Me Be There. This version, as well as the song itself, features prominently in the Japanese animated film, Whisper of the Heart.

Fallout 76 version
A cover version of the song, a collaboration between Copilot Music and Sound and the vocal group Spank, was commissioned for and featured in both the teaser and full E3 2018 trailers for the 2018 video game Fallout 76, with its plot events are set in West Virginia. Released as an iTunes-only single on July 4, 2018, the song reached No. 1 on the iTunes singles chart. It debuted at No. 41 on Billboard's Hot Country Songs chart that week and at No. 21 on Billboard's Country Digital Songs the following week. The official YouTube upload of the original John Denver recording, initially uploaded in 2013, would later edit its description in response to the song's use for the game. In Australia, a promotional Fallout 76 vinyl featuring the cover was included with the December 2018 issue of STACK Magazine exclusively from retailer JB Hi-Fi.

Forever Country
The song found further chart success as part of the Forever Country medley and video, created in 2016 to celebrate the 50th anniversary of the Country Music Association Awards.

References

United States state songs
1970 songs
Hermes House Band songs
John Denver songs
Oricon International Singles Chart number-one singles
Songs about West Virginia
Songs written by Bill Danoff
Songs written by John Denver
West Virginia Mountaineers football
Shenandoah River
1971 singles
RCA Records singles
Song recordings produced by Milt Okun
Cashbox number-one singles
Number-one singles in Scotland
American country music songs
Songs about roads